The San Juan Mountains is a high and rugged mountain range in the Rocky Mountains in southwestern Colorado and northwestern New Mexico. The area is highly mineralized (the Colorado Mineral Belt) and figured in the gold and silver mining industry of early Colorado.  Major towns, all old mining camps, include Creede, Lake City, Silverton, Ouray, and Telluride.  Large scale mining has ended in the region, although independent prospectors still work claims throughout the range. The last large scale mines  were the Sunnyside Mine near Silverton, which operated until late in the 20th century and the Idarado Mine on Red Mountain Pass that closed down in the 1970s.  Famous old San Juan mines include the Camp Bird and Smuggler Union mines, both located between Telluride and Ouray.

The Summitville mine was the scene of a major environmental disaster in the 1990s when the liner of a cyanide-laced tailing pond began leaking heavily. Summitville is in the Summitville caldera, one of many extinct volcanoes making up the San Juan volcanic field. Large beds of lava, some extending under the floor of the San Luis Valley, are characteristic of the eastern slope of the San Juans.

Tourism is now a major part of  the regional economy, with the narrow gauge railway between Durango and Silverton being an attraction in the summer. Jeeping is popular on the old trails which linked the historic mining camps, including the notorious Black Bear Road. Visiting old ghost towns is popular, as is wilderness trekking and mountain climbing. Many of the old mining camps are now popular sites of summer homes. Though the San Juans are extremely steep and receive much snow, so far only Telluride has made the transition to a major ski resort. Purgatory Resort, once known as Durango Mountain Resort, is a small ski area 26 miles north of Durango. There is also skiing on Wolf Creek Pass at the Wolf Creek ski area.  Recently Silverton Mountain ski area has begun operation near Silverton. The range is also a popular destination for endurance sports like trail running and mountain biking; Silverton is home to the Hardrock 100 Endurance Run one of the most difficult and technical ultra marathons in the world. 

The Rio Grande drains the east side of the range. The other side of the San Juans, the western slope of the continental divide, is drained by tributaries of the San Juan, Dolores and Gunnison rivers, which all flow into the Colorado River.

The San Juan and Uncompahgre National Forests cover a large portion of the San Juan Mountains. The Continental Divide Trail, a long-distance hiking trail follows the crest of the San Juan Mountains.

The San Juan Mountains are also distinctive for their high altitude plateaus and peaks. As a result, facilities in the towns and cities of the region are among the highest in the nation. Telluride Airport, at an elevation of 9,070 feet, is the highest in the United States with regularly scheduled commercial service.

Prominent peaks

 Note: This is only a partial list of important peaks in the San Juans, listing peaks by prominence only.  There are dozens more summits over 12,000 feet.

History of the area
Mining operators in the San Juan mountain area formed the San Juan District Mining Association (SJDMA) in 1903, as a direct result of a Western Federation of Miners proposal to the Telluride Mining Association for the eight-hour day, which had been approved in a referendum by 72 percent of Colorado voters. The new association consolidated the power of thirty-six mining properties in San Miguel, Ouray, and San Juan counties. The SJDMA refused to consider any reduction in hours or increase in wages, helping to provoke a bitter strike.

See also

Southern Rocky Mountains
Sneffels Range
Cimarron Ridge
Needle Mountains
La Garita Mountains
Cochetopa Hills
La Plata Mountains
Hardrock Hundred Mile Endurance Run

References

Further reading
Bove, D. et al. (2001). Geochronology and geology of Late Oligocene through Miocene volcanism and mineralization in the western San Juan Mountains, Colorado [U.S. Geological Survey Professional Paper 1642]. Washington, D.C.: U.S. Department of the Interior, U.S. Geological Survey.
Lipman, P.W. (2006). Geologic map of the central San Juan Caldera Cluster, southwestern Colorado [Geologic Investigations Series I-2799]. Reston, VA: U.S. Department of the Interior, U.S. Geological Survey.

External links

Widerange.org: Photos of the San Juan Mountains
San Juan Mountains @ Peakbagger
Southern Rocky Mountains @ Peakbagger
Rocky Mountains @ Peakbagger

 
Mountain ranges of Colorado
Ranges of the Rocky Mountains
Mountain ranges of Ouray County, Colorado
Landforms of Hinsdale County, Colorado
Landforms of San Juan County, Colorado
Landforms of San Miguel County, Colorado
San Juan National Forest
Uncompahgre National Forest